Ganløse is a town located in the Egedal Municipality, in the Capital Region of Denmark.

Notable people 
 Hans Knudsen (1865–1947) a Danish artist of landscape paintings. He lived close to the forest edge of Ganløse Ore in Egedal, right on the border with Værløse. He died west of Ganløse at Slagslunde
 Poul Reichhardt (1913 in Ganløse – 1985) a Danish actor, known for his roles in Danish 1940s/1950s comedies 
 Büsra Barut (born 1997 in Ganløse) a Turkish-Danish women's football forward

References

Cities and towns in the Capital Region of Denmark
Egedal Municipality